Simlinge Church is a medieval Lutheran church north-east of Trelleborg, Sweden. It belongs to the Diocese of Lund.

History and architecture
The church dates from circa 1200 and is constructed of brick. During the 15th century, the original wooden ceiling was replaced with the currently visible vaults. The tower dates from 1852.

References

External links
Official site (in Swedish)

Churches in Skåne County
Churches in the Diocese of Lund
Churches converted from the Roman Catholic Church to the Church of Sweden